Hitchenia is a genus of plants in the ginger family. It contains only one recognized species, Hitchenia glauca, endemic to Myanmar (Burma). The plant, which is called malaphu (မာလာဖူး) in Burmese, is used as an herb in Burmese cuisine.

A few other species were formerly included in Hitchenia but have been moved to other genera:

Hitchenia careyana Benth. in G.Bentham & J.D.Hooker = Larsenianthus careyanus (Benth.) W.J.Kress & Mood
Hitchenia caulina (J.Graham) Baker  = Curcuma caulina J.Graham
Hitchenia musacea Baker = Stachyphrynium latifolium (Blume) K.Schum. 
Hitchenia roscoeana (Wall.) Benth. & Hook.f. = Curcuma roscoeana Wall.

Curcuma and Larsenianthus are in the family Zingiberaceae , but Stachyphrynium is in Marantaceae.

References

External links
Hawaii Tropical Botanical Garden, Hitchenia glauca 'Rangoon Beauty' photo

Zingiberoideae
Zingiberaceae genera
Endemic flora of Myanmar
Monotypic Zingiberales genera